Colors Bangla (previously known as ETV Bangla) is an Indian general entertainment pay television channel broadcasting in Bengali language. It was launched in 2000 as ETV Bangla, owned by the Hyderabad-based ETV Network. It was later sold to TV18 and was rebranded under the Colors moniker.

History
The channel aired the Filmfare Awards East 2017. The channel was re-branded under the Viacom18 Colors franchise on 1 April 2015. Colors Bangla started their HD channel from 2 May 2016 along with the HD versions of Colors Kannada and Colors Marathi. On 30 August 2021 6:30 PM IST, on account of Janmashtami it rebranded and introduced new graphics after almost 5 and a half years, where it is not only pink colour, but also with violet swoosh, and the wordmark 'Bangla' is now of white colour instead of red colour and the red colour is bordering the 'Bangla' wordmark. The channel changed its tagline to 'Notun Shopner Rong'.

Currently broadcasts

Fiction

Dubbed shows

Formerly broadcasts

Fiction

Aastha
Annapurna
Arakshaniya
Aloukik
Apur Kotha
Arakshaniya
Banhishika
Barir Naam Bhalobasha 
Bhorer Khub Kache
Bisharjan
Bitore O Bahire
Biyer School
Dhup Chhaya
Dui Prithibi
Dutta Barir Chhoto Bou
Durgeshnandani
E Amar Gurudakshina
Hushiyar Bangla
Jaya
Kacher Manush
Khola Hawa
Kokhono Megh Kokhono Bristi
Krishnakoli Tarei Boli
Lal Trikon
Lukochuri
Nana Ronger Dinguli
Neelpori
Niyoti
Pala Badal
Probhu Amar
Rahasya Golpo
Ranga Mathaye Chiruni
Sabujer Deshe
Shaanjhbela
Shesh Theke Shuru
Shishirer Shobdo
Shonar Horin
Shudhu Tomari Jonyo
Soubhagyaboti
Satin Kanta
Shubho Bibaho
Tithir Atithi

Dubbed series
Adorer Chhowa
Proloy theke Sristi — Mohakali
Barrister Babu
Sopoth Bhalobasar
Debangshi
Srijar Shwoshurbari
Premer Agun
Naagin 1, 2, 3, 4, 5, 6
Kichhu toh Acchei: Nagin
Ram Sitar Luv Kush
Sobar Boro Thakur Shani
Tontro Montro
Chandrakanta
Chena Ochena
Pran Bhomra
Shokti Astitver Anubhutir
Bish
Code Red
Chakravartin Ashoka Samrat
Koboch Mahashiboratri
Kotha Kahini
Sri Sri Siddhidata Ganesh

Non-fiction shows
Bigg Boss Bangla
Bigg Boss Bangla 1
Bigg Boss Bangla 2
Ke Hobe Banglar Kotipoti (season 2)
Ranna Ghorer Goppo
Rojgere Ginni

Mahalaya
Colors Bangla is hosting its Mahalaya since 2000. Various television and films actresses are seen in different forms of Maa Durga. Even various television actors are seen as Shiv, Vishnu, Brahmma, Mahishasur. It also shows dance performance where dancers will dance in a song welcoming the arrival of Goddess. It hosted its first mahalaya in 2000 and Dancer-Actress Sudha Chandran for the first time was seen as Mahishasuramardini.

References

External links

Bengali-language television channels in India
ETV Network
Television channels and stations established in 2000
Television stations in Kolkata
Viacom 18
2000 establishments in West Bengal